Zibusiso Mkhwanazi (born 10 June 1983, Soweto, South Africa) is Group CEO of M&N Brands and co-founder of Avatar, Avatar won Financial Mail's AdFocus medium-sized agency of the year 2016 and were a finalist in 2017. A World Economic Forum Young Global Leader, Mkhwanazi is now building an African owned agency network through his investment company, M&N Brands.

Mkhwanazi is a Trustee of the National Economic and Education Trust (NEET), which has provided over 4,200 scholarships to underprivileged ICT students. Born in 1983, he is the founder of David's League, a Christianity-based mentorship program to support young entrepreneurs.

Career 
Mkhwanazi started his first business, Csonke, a web design company, at the age of 17 (in 2000). Csonke then merged with Krazyboyz in 2007 and Mkhwanazi served as Executive Chairman until July 2010, developing and overseeing growth, strategy and marketing for both the Cape Town and Johannesburg offices. He then took on the role of CEO from July 2010 – December 2011.

In January 2012, Mkhwanazi went into partnership with Veli Ngubane to found Avatar, which has won numerous awards (AdFocus) including most digitally integrated agency (MarkLives) and also the agency that has done the most to drive transformation in the SA industry (MarkLives). Avatar opened their Cape Town office in 2016 and have won numerous accounts such as H&M and Chevron.

He also served as Chairman of ARM advertising and design in 2009, as well as Chairman of The Red quarter Brand Design August 2010 – November 2013.

Mkhwanazi is the majority shareholder in M&N Brands, with partner Veli Ngubane, an investment company building an African owned agency network. In 2017 they acquired Mela Events, a gold-Loerie award-winning events company with clients such as Standard Bank and Nando's. In 2017, the 33-year-old Financial Mail ADFocus awards created the industry's first transformation award at Mkhwanazi's urging, which was sponsored by M&N Brands.

Education 
"Mkhwanazi’s story from the humble streets of Soweto" is as follows:

Bramley primary school, Bedfordview High School, NDip Information Technology (2005) and Dip Corporate Law (2006) at the University of Johannesburg, Foundations for Leadership in the 21st Century (2012) Yale and Global Leadership and Public Policy for the 21st Century (2013) at Harvard.

Awards and distinctions 

 BBQ Young Business Achiever in 2007
 100 Young South Africans June 2007
 Top ICT Individual in Africa and Top ICT Young Entrepreneur in Africa, both in 2008
 Men's Health Best Man Editor's Choice Award in 2009
 200 Young South Africans
 IT Personality finalist for 2009 and 2010
 World Economic Forum Young Global leader
 Finalist for Best Individual Contribution to SA Digital Marketing, 2011.
 Named Top 25 media game changer, 2012 and Media Rockstar 2013.
 Financial Mail Adfocus New Broom Award, 2014
 Top 40 under 40s in The Media, 2015.
Contender Most admired ad agency boss in South Africa 2016
AALBA 2017 finalist
EY World Entrepreneur of the Year 2018 Finalist

References

Further reading
From selling candy to tasting success
Avatar Agency Group cleared by a second independent investigation report on Brand SA
Zibusiso Mkhwanazi on protecting your agency’s brand: operational quagmire
BREAKING: M&C Saatchi Group, Avatar part ways
 Agency Leaders 2016: Most digitally integrated ad agency in Jozi
 Content marketing
 Zibusiso Mkhwanazi on why the digital industry’s still a white boys’ club
 702 Fm
 Agency Leaders 2016: Most admired ad agency boss in South Africa
 BigReads2017: Transformation, ratings, circulations & other issues.
 Big Q: Transformation — clients must take road less travelled
 The digital dream kid
 M&N Brands launches agency with SKYY as 1st client
 Big Q: Transformation — clients must take road less travelled
 Launching an ad agency with 2000 bucks
 Bringing the industry back to local ownership
 An evolution in digital media planning
 Black-owned marketing agency, Avatar buys a stake in M&C Saatchi Abel
 Digital brings deeper understanding of SA consumers
 GRANT SITHOLE JOINS AVATAR AS JOINT ECD
 BRETT WILD JOINS AVATAR AS JOZI ECD
 PLAATJIE TO HEAD AVATAR IN CAPE TOWN
 AVASTARS SPENT 67 MINUTES AT IKAGELENG DAY CARE

South African businesspeople
1983 births
Living people
University of Johannesburg alumni